All-New X-Factor was an ongoing comic book series published by Marvel Comics which debuted in January 2014, as part of the All-New Marvel NOW! event and a relaunch of X-Factor.

Publication History
Focusing on a new iteration of the X-Factor superhero team, the series is written by Peter David and is a follow up to his previous book, X-Factor vol. 2, whose incarnation of X-Factor was a private investigation company. The opening storyline, which continues events from issue #260 of the previous series, sees a return to the corporate-sponsored version of the team that was the initial concept when the first version of X-Factor debuted in 1986, and initially featured six team members; Polaris, Quicksilver, Gambit, Danger, Warlock and Cypher. All New X-Factor was cancelled after 20 issues due to low sales.

Fictional Team Biography

Critical reception
Peter David's writing of Quicksilver earned the character a 2014  award from Ain't It Cool News. AICN's Matt Adler commented that David writes the character best, and that the "arrogant, impatient speedster" made the title worth following.

Collected editions

References 

X-Factor (comics)